Weybridge is a town in Addison County, Vermont, United States. The population was 814 at the 2020 census.

Geography
Weybridge is located in central Addison County in the Champlain Valley. It is bordered by the town of Middlebury to the southeast, Cornwall to the south, Bridport to the southwest, Addison to the west, and New Haven to the north. Otter Creek forms much of the northern and eastern border of the town.

Demographics

As of the census of 2000, there were 824 people, 322 households, and 230 families residing in the town.  The population density was 48.5 people per square mile (18.7/km2).  There were 334 housing units at an average density of 19.6 per square mile (7.6/km2).  The racial makeup of the town was 98.42% White, 0.61% African American, 0.49% Asian, and 0.49% from two or more races. Hispanic or Latino of any race were 1.58% of the population.

There were 322 households, out of which 32.9% had children under the age of 18 living with them, 64.3% were married couples living together, 4.3% had a female householder with no husband present, and 28.3% were non-families. 20.8% of all households were made up of individuals, and 10.9% had someone living alone who was 65 years of age or older.  The average household size was 2.56 and the average family size was 2.99.

In the town, the age distribution of the population shows 25.0% under the age of 18, 4.5% from 18 to 24, 26.9% from 25 to 44, 28.6% from 45 to 64, and 14.9% who were 65 years of age or older.  The median age was 41 years. For every 100 females, there were 94.8 males.  For every 100 females age 18 and over, there were 94.3 males.

The median income for a household in the town was $51,833, and the median income for a family was $56,591. Males had a median income of $35,833 versus $30,089 for females. The per capita income for the town was $24,735.  About 2.2% of families and 3.6% of the population were below the poverty line, including 3.4% of those under age 18 and 7.4% of those age 65 or over.

Notable people 

 Claire D. Ayer, state senator
 Chris Bohjalian, novelist
 Charity Bryant, writer, business owner
 Darius Clark, physician and politician
 Sylvia Drake, tailor, long-term partner of Charity Bryant
 Sidney Lawrence, US congressman
 George T. Tobin, American illustrator, native of Weybridge
 Silas Wright, US senator

References

External links
 Town of Weybridge official website

 
Towns in Vermont
Towns in Addison County, Vermont